Syntormon pallipes is a species of fly in the family Dolichopodidae. It is found in the Palearctic, Oriental and Afrotropical realms. In 2019, the mitochondrial genome of S. pallipes was sequenced, as the first representative of the subfamily Sympycninae.

Syntormon pseudospicatus is sometimes treated as a synonym of S. pallipes, but they are argued by Drake (2020) to be distinct species.

A subspecies named Syntormon pallipes longistylus was described by Igor Grichanov from Madagascar in 2001. In 2020, it was determined that this subspecies was in fact a distinct species, Syntormon longistylus.

References

External links
Images representing Syntormon pallipes at BOLD

Sympycninae
Insects described in 1794
Diptera of Europe
Diptera of Asia
Diptera of Africa
Taxa named by Johan Christian Fabricius